Osmar Fernández (born 20 February 2000) is a Paraguayan footballer who plays as a forward for Argentine side Crucero del Norte.

Career

Club career
Fernández is a product of Club Sol de América. He got his professional debut for the club in the Paraguayan Primera División on 8 December 2018, when he was in the starting lineup against General Díaz. In the following season, Fernández played 13 league games for América and scored one goal. In the 2020 season, Fernández played for the clubs U-23 team and was only on the bench for one Paraguayan Primera División.

In 2021, Fernández joined Paraguayan División Intermedia side Atlético Colegiales. In June 2022, Fernández joined Argentine side Crucero del Norte.

References

External links
 

Living people
2000 births
Paraguayan footballers
Paraguayan expatriate footballers
Association football forwards
Paraguayan Primera División players
Club Sol de América footballers
Atlético Colegiales players
Crucero del Norte footballers
Paraguayan expatriate sportspeople in Argentina
Expatriate footballers in Argentina